In mathematical analysis, a Pompeiu derivative is a real-valued function of one real variable that is the derivative of an everywhere differentiable function and that vanishes in a dense set. In particular, a Pompeiu derivative is discontinuous at any point where it is not 0. Whether non-identically zero such functions may exist was a problem that arose in the context of early-1900s research on functional differentiability and integrability. The question was affirmatively answered by Dimitrie Pompeiu by constructing an explicit example; these functions are therefore named after him.

Pompeiu's construction
Pompeiu's construction is described here. Let  denote the real cube root of the real number . Let  be an enumeration of the rational numbers in the unit interval . Define  by

Moreover, it turns out that the function  is differentiable, with

Properties
 It is known that the zero-set of a derivative of any everywhere differentiable function (and more generally, of any Baire class one function) is a  subset of the real line. By definition, for any Pompeiu function, this set is a dense  set; therefore  it is a  residual set. In particular, it possesses uncountably many points.
 A linear combination  of Pompeiu functions is a derivative, and vanishes on the set , which is a dense  set by the Baire category theorem. Thus, Pompeiu functions form a vector space of functions.
 A limit function of a uniformly convergent sequence of Pompeiu derivatives is a Pompeiu derivative. Indeed, it is a derivative, due to the theorem of limit under the sign of derivative. Moreover, it vanishes in the intersection of the zero sets of the functions of the sequence: since these are dense  sets, the zero set of the limit function is also dense.
 As a consequence, the class  of all bounded Pompeiu derivatives on an interval  is a closed linear subspace of the Banach space of all bounded functions under the uniform distance (hence, it is a Banach space).
Pompeiu's above construction of a positive function is a rather peculiar example of a Pompeiu's function: a theorem of Weil states that generically a Pompeiu derivative assumes both positive and negative values in dense sets, in the precise meaning that such functions constitute a residual set of the Banach space .

References
 
 Andrew M. Bruckner, "Differentiation of real functions"; CRM Monograph series, Montreal (1994).

Real analysis